Streptomyces alni is a Gram-positive, aerobic, mesophilic bacterium species from the genus Streptomyces which has been isolated from roots of the tree Alnus nepalensis in Xishuangbanna on the Nannuo Mountain in China.

See also 
 List of Streptomyces species

References

Further reading

External links
Type strain of Streptomyces alni at BacDive -  the Bacterial Diversity Metadatabase

alni
Bacteria described in 1958